Roy Gumbs (born 29 December 1969) is an Anguillan international footballer who plays as a striker.

Career
Gumbs has played club football in England for Beaconsfield SYCOB and Slough Town.

He made one international appearance for Anguilla in 2008.

References

1969 births
Living people
Anguillan footballers
Slough Town F.C. players
Beaconsfield Town F.C. players
Association football forwards
Anguilla international footballers